The Careers Scotland Space School, also known as the Scottish Space School, is an organisation set up by Careers Scotland and funded by the Scottish Government. This is a government programme, organised as a partnership initiative with NASA (National Aeronautics and Space Administration), to encourage young people to gain an interest in STEM subjects, Science, Technology, Engineering and Maths.

The Initiatives
The programme provides support teaching materials and includes provision for 120 pupils to attend a summer school, which focuses on electronics and life sciences, at the University of Strathclyde. There is also a series of visits to schools by NASA astronauts and scientists. For example, in June 2007 staff from NASA attended an exhibition in Nairn. In 2007 it is using a staged competition-like structure, with the top prize (for 52 students) a 12-day trip to Johnson Space Center, in Houston, Texas.

Endorsing the Programme
In March 2007, Nick Patrick, to show his support for the Space School, returned to Edinburgh, carrying a saltire flag that had been with him on his first NASA space mission, with a student who was participating in the Space School.

The Scotsman described the initiative as "a world-leading programme". Alex Blackwood, the programme founder, won the 2006 Achievement in Education Sir Arthur Clarke Award. A regular invited presenter at the school is the Cyborg scientist Kevin Warwick.

References

Organisations supported by the Scottish Government
Education in Scotland
Science education in the United Kingdom
Science and technology in Scotland